Rex E. Wallace (born September 13, 1952) is an American linguist and classical scholar specializing in Etruscan language, languages of ancient Italy, epigraphy, historical linguistics. He served as Professor of Classics at University of Massachusetts Amherst from 1985 until his retirement in 2018.

Biography
Rex Erwin Wallace was born September 13, 1952. He received his B.A. and his M.A. from the University of Nebraska in Classical languages, and his Ph.D. in Linguistics from the Ohio State University. He spent a year at the American Academy in Rome as the Oscar Broneer Fellow in Classical Studies. He was appointed Professor of Classics with the University of Massachusetts Amherst in 1985. He is a past recipient of the Rome Prize Fellowship, and co-editor of Rasenna, electronic journal of Etruscan archaeological and linguistic studies. His main research and teaching interests are Etruscan, Pre-Roman, Latin and Greek linguistics, historical linguistics, and morphology.

Selected publications
 Language files, materials, 1982.	
 Lucilius and satire in second-century BC Rome, 1985.
 Res gestae divi Augusti : as recorded in the Monumentum Ancyranum and the Monumentum Antiochenum, 2000.
 An introduction to wall inscriptions from Pompeii and Herculaneum, Bolchazy-Carducci publishers, 2005.
 The Sabellic Languages of Ancient Italy, Lincom, 2007.
 Zikh Rasna. A Manual of Etruscan Language and Inscriptions, Beech Stave, 2008.
 The archaeology of language at Poggio Civitate (Murlo) 2013.
 Language, Alphabet and Linguistic Affiliation'', in S. Bell and A. Carpino, eds., "A Companion to the Etruscans", Wiley-Blackwell, 2016

References

External links
 Rex E. Wallace at the website of Archaeological Institute of America
Rex E. Wallace at WorldCat
Rex E. Wallace at the website of University of Massachusetts Amherst

American classical scholars
Linguists from the United States
University of Nebraska alumni
University of Massachusetts Amherst faculty
Living people
1952 births
Fulbright alumni